Luguelín Miguel Santos Aquino (born 12 November 1992) is a Dominican sprinter, who specialises in the 400 m. He was the silver medallist in the event at the 2012 London Olympics at the age of eighteen. His personal best is 44.11 seconds.

Santos emerged with two gold medals at the 2010 Summer Youth Olympics and made his senior breakthrough at the 2011 Pan American Games, taking individual and relay silver medals with Dominican national record times. He won his country's first medal at the World Junior Championships in Athletics by winning the 400 m title in 2012. He belongs to the Dominican olympic program CRESO.

Career

Early life
Born in Bayaguana to Juan Santos Santos (a lift operator) and Irma Aquino Mejia (a housewife), Luguelín Santos's upbringing was marked by poverty. His older cousin, Celia Aquino, suggested that he and his brother, Juander, start competing in athletics as she did. He began running in 2002, although he ran barefoot, as he had no shoes and he was often hungry. There was no running track near where he lived in Monte Plata Province, so he trained at the local baseball stadium instead. He initially tried long distances, then moved down to middle distances, before finally settling on the 400 m at the age of fourteen.

In 2008, the fourteen-year-old Santos ran the 400 m in 53 seconds and he decided to take the sport seriously after running at the national schools championships. His performances attracted the attention of José Ludwig Rubio, a Dominican coach and former president of the national association. The following year he ran a personal best of 47.58 seconds and made his international debut at the 2009 Pan American Junior Athletics Championships. He was eliminated in the first round of the 400 m and was impressed at the speed of fellow Caribbean athlete Rondell Bartholomew. He broke his first national junior record at the competition as part of the Dominican 4×400 metres relay team, running a time of 3:13.18 minutes. A visa problem caused him to miss out on the 2009 World Youth Championships in Athletics.

The 2010 season saw him win further accolades as he ran a Dominican youth and junior record time of 46.19 seconds in June and a week later won the silver medal at the 2010 Central American and Caribbean Junior Championships. Held at Santo Domingo's Estadio Olímpico Félix Sánchez, Santos also won a relay bronze and knocked two and half seconds off the national junior record. Stepping up to the global stage, he came sixth in the final at the 2010 World Junior Championships in Athletics then achieved his first major victories at the Youth Olympic Games in Singapore, taking the 400 m and sprint medley relay titles.

First senior medals
At the start of 2011 he moved to San Germán, Puerto Rico to be close to his coach and study at the Interamerican University of Puerto Rico. A hamstring injury hampered his training in the first half of the year and also led to him pulling up in the final at the 2011 Central American and Caribbean Championships. He missed qualification for the 2011 World Championships in Athletics, but his form returned in August as he ran under 46 seconds in Bogotá. He excelled at the 2011 Pan American Games, where a series of good runs culminated in two silver medals and two Dominican records. He ran 44.71 seconds (beating Felix Sánchez's time) to take the 400 m silver medal behind Nery Brenes, then helped the Dominican 4 × 400 m relay quartet to a second national record of 3:00.44 minutes to finish as runners-up behind Cuba.

Building upon his success in regional competition, he ran for the first time indoors at the 2012 IAAF World Indoor Championships, reaching the semi-finals and setting an indoor best of 46.83 seconds. He made a strong start on major track circuit, finishing second at the Doha Diamond League meeting with a time of 44.88 seconds. He was second at the Golden Spike Ostrava, then had a winning run of 44.45 seconds at the FBK Games, which ranked him third on the all-time junior lists. He also ran a national junior record of 20.73 seconds for the 200 metres that month. His first Diamond League win followed at the Adidas Grand Prix, where he beat former World and Olympic champion Jeremy Wariner. A day later he ran at the 2012 Ibero-American Championships in Athletics in Barquisimeto with the Dominican relay team, taking a bronze medal and securing their place at the Olympics.

Olympic silver medal

He became his country's first ever medallist at the World Junior Championships in Barcelona, missing his aim of the championship record but still winning by a margin of more than half a second in 44.85. Acknowledging his quick progression, he said: "so far only Americans have finished in under 44 seconds, I want to be the first from somewhere else". He was beaten to that distinction by Grenada's Kirani James in the 400 m final at the 2012 Summer Olympics. Santos was next to finish after James, however, as he ran within 0.01 of his personal best time to claim an unexpected Olympic silver medal. His was the third ever medal for the Dominican Republic, coming just 45 minutes after Felix Sánchez won his second Olympic gold. A team of Gustavo Cuesta, Felix Sánchez, Joel Mejia and Santos appeared to have qualified for the 4 × 400 m relay final, but the second baton change was outside of the changeover zone and the team was disqualified.

2013-2016 
In the 400 m final of the 2013 World Championships, Santos went from a non-medalling position to finishing in the bronze medal position, after closing down several athletes on the homestraight, including the defending champion, Kirani James.

Santos won the 400 m gold medal in the 2015 Pan American Games. Despite being among the pre-race favourites for the 2015 World Championships 400 metres, Santos finished in fourth place in the finals. However, in doing so, he gained the distinction of holding the fastest ever non-medalling time in that event. He also broke his own National Record.

At the 2016 Olympics, Santos finished second in his 400 m preliminary heat, behind Wayde Van Niekerk (who was to go onto break the World Record in the final). In the semi-final, Santos ran a Season's Best of 44.71, as he finished 4th and didn't reach the final.

International competitions

1Disqualified in the final

Personal bests
200 metres: 20.55 (2013)
300 metres: 32.56 (2012)
400 metres: 44.11 (2015) NR
400 metres (indoor): 45.80 (2017) NR

References

External links
Luguelín Santos profile

Tilastopaja profile

 
 

1993 births
Living people
Dominican Republic male sprinters
Athletes (track and field) at the 2010 Summer Youth Olympics
Athletes (track and field) at the 2012 Summer Olympics
Athletes (track and field) at the 2016 Summer Olympics
Olympic athletes of the Dominican Republic
Olympic silver medalists for the Dominican Republic
Pan American Games medalists in athletics (track and field)
Medalists at the 2012 Summer Olympics
World Athletics Championships athletes for the Dominican Republic
Athletes (track and field) at the 2011 Pan American Games
Athletes (track and field) at the 2015 Pan American Games
Athletes (track and field) at the 2019 Pan American Games
Pan American Games silver medalists for the Dominican Republic
Pan American Games gold medalists for the Dominican Republic
World Athletics Championships medalists
Olympic silver medalists in athletics (track and field)
Universiade medalists in athletics (track and field)
People from Monte Plata Province
Central American and Caribbean Games gold medalists for the Dominican Republic
Competitors at the 2014 Central American and Caribbean Games
Competitors at the 2018 Central American and Caribbean Games
Universiade gold medalists for the Dominican Republic
IAAF Continental Cup winners
Youth Olympic gold medalists for the Dominican Republic
Central American and Caribbean Games medalists in athletics
Medalists at the 2015 Summer Universiade
Medalists at the 2017 Summer Universiade
Medalists at the 2015 Pan American Games
Medalists at the 2011 Pan American Games
Youth Olympic gold medalists in athletics (track and field)
Athletes (track and field) at the 2020 Summer Olympics
Medalists at the 2020 Summer Olympics